Tanveer Ghazi is an Indian lyricist, poet and author known for his work predominantly in Bollywood films like Pink (2016 film), October (2018 film), Hate Story 2, Yeh Saali Aashiqui, 18.11: A Code of Secrecy and Ek Tha Hero.

Tanveer Ghazi has participated in several TV programs including Sahitya Aajtak.

References

Indian lyricists
Indian poets
Year of birth missing (living people)
Living people